Elachista leucosoma is a moth in the family Elachistidae. It was described by Edward Meyrick in 1922. It is found in India (Punjab).

The wingspan is about 7 mm. The forewings are light grey, irrorated with dark grey. The hindwings are grey.

References

Moths described in 1922
leucosoma
Moths of Asia